The 24th Mieczysław Połukard Criterium of Polish Speedway League Aces was the 2005 version of the Mieczysław Połukard Criterium of Polish Speedway Leagues Aces. It took place on March 28 in the Polonia Stadium in Bydgoszcz, Poland.

Starting positions draw 

 Jacek Krzyżaniak - Budlex-Polonia Bydgoszcz
 Grzegorz Walasek - Złomrex-Włókniarz Częstochowa
 Krzysztof Kasprzak - Unia Leszno
 Rune Holta - Złomrex-Włókniarz Częstochowa
 Piotr Protasiewicz - Budlex-Polonia Bydgoszcz
 Mariusz Staszewski - ZKŻ Kronopol Zielona Góra
 Tomasz Jędrzejak - KM Intar Ostrów Wlkp.
 Robert Miśkowiak - Atlas Wrocław
 Robert Kościecha - Lotos Gdańsk
 Robert Sawina - Budlex-Polonia Bydgoszcz
 Jarosław Hampel - Atlas Wrocław
 Wiesław Jaguś - Apator-Adriana Toruń
 Andrzej Huszcza - ZKŻ Kronopol Zielona Góra
 Michał Robacki - Budlex-Polonia Bydgoszcz
 Adrian Miedziński - Apator-Adriana Toruń
 Rafał Okoniewski - ZKŻ Kronopol Zielona Góra
 (R1) Krzysztof Buczkowski - Budlex-Polonia Bydgoszcz
 (R2) Marcin Jędrzejewski - Budlex-Polonia Bydgoszcz

Heat details

Notes

Sources 
 Roman Lach - Polish Speedway Almanac

See also 

Criterium of Aces
Mieczysław Połukard Criterium of Polish Speedway Leagues Aces